Leinefelde-Worbis is a town in the district of Eichsfeld, in northwestern  Thuringia, Germany. The town was formed on  March 16, 2004, from the former independent towns Leinefelde and Worbis along with the municipalities of Breitenbach and Wintzingerode. In July 2018 the former municipality of Hundeshagen, and in January 2019 Kallmerode was merged into Leinefelde-Worbis. The population before the amalgamation was 14,387 for Leinefelde, 5,541 for Worbis, 1,021 for Breitenbach and 614 for Wintzingerode. The 10 parts of Leinefelde-Worbis are Leinefelde, Worbis, Breitenbach, Kirchohmfeld, Birkungen, Beuren, Hundeshagen, Kaltohmfeld, Wintzingrode, Kallmerode and Breitenholz.

Transport

Leinefelde station is located on the Halle–Hann. Münden and the Gotha–Leinefelde railways.

Bear sanctuary

Since 1997 Worbis has become known for its bear sanctuary, the Alternativer Bärenpark Worbis, which is operated by the German animal welfare organisation Aktion Tier – Menschen für Tiere (formerly Deutsches Tierhilfswerk).

Museums

The Borderland Museum Eichsfeld, a Cold War history museum located only a few miles away from Leinefelde-Worbis, presents different topics of the history of the German division and the GDR on an area of 1,000 squaremetres. The exhibition is displayed in both German and English.

People

Leinefelde is the birthplace of Johann Carl Fuhlrott, the discoverer of Neanderthal man. It is also the birthplace of Johannes Krause, who determined the Denisovan are a distinct line of homo distinct from modern humans and Neanderthals. Fuhlrott and Krause, born nearly 180 years apart, were also professors at the University of Tübingen.

Worbis is the birthplace of Bernard Quaritch (1819-1899), the London second-hand bookseller and publisher, and of Barbara Saß-Viehweger (born 1943), a German politician, lawyer and civil law notary.

References

Eichsfeld (district)